Philippe Cuervo (born 13 August 1969) is a French former professional footballer who played as a defender or midfielder.

Career
Cuervo started his senior career with AS Saint-Étienne. In 1997, he signed for Swindon Town in the English Football League Second Division, where he made forty-eight appearances and scored zero goals. After that, he played for French clubs US Créteil-Lusitanos, Stade Lavallois, Red Star and Montgeron before retiring in 2007.

References

External links 
 Philippe Cuervo: "L'ASSE, comme une deuxième famille" 
 Philippe here for the beer 
 YOU BET; MAC'S A WINNER 
 Swindon-Town-FC.co.uk Profile
 

1969 births
Living people
French footballers
Association football defenders
Association football midfielders
French expatriate footballers
Expatriate footballers in England
French expatriate sportspeople in England
AS Saint-Étienne players
FC Sochaux-Montbéliard players
Swindon Town F.C. players
US Créteil-Lusitanos players
Stade Lavallois players
Red Star F.C. players
Ligue 1 players
Ligue 2 players
English Football League players